Miloš Milović (born 22 December 1995) is a Montenegrin footballer who plays as a defender for Voždovac and the Montenegro national team.

Career
Milović made his international debut for Montenegro on 11 November 2020 in a friendly match against Kazakhstan.

Career statistics

International

References

External links
 
 
 
 Miloš Milović at National-Football-Teams.com

1995 births
Living people
People from Budva
Montenegrin footballers
Montenegro youth international footballers
Montenegro international footballers
Montenegrin expatriate footballers
Montenegrin expatriate sportspeople in Finland
Expatriate footballers in Finland
Montenegrin expatriate sportspeople in Kosovo
Expatriate footballers in Kosovo
Montenegrin expatriate sportspeople in Serbia
Expatriate footballers in Serbia
Association football defenders
FK Mogren players
FC Honka players
FC Prishtina players
FK Arsenal Tivat players
FK Bokelj players
FK Kom players
FK Voždovac players
Montenegrin First League players
Montenegrin Second League players
Veikkausliiga players
Football Superleague of Kosovo players
Serbian SuperLiga players